Lieutenant-General  Jacobus Nicolas Bierman  (1910–1977) was a South African military commander. He played one Rugby Test Match for the Springbok team in 1931

Military career
He joined the South African Army in 1934.  During World War II he served in North Africa, and commanded the artillery of the South African 6th Armoured Division in Italy.

He served as Army Chief of Staff from 1958 to 1959, as Inspector-General from 1959 to 1960, as Director of Planning and Operations from 1960 to 1965, and as General Officer Commanding Joint Combat Forces (GOCJCF), co-ordinating Army and Air Force operations and training, from 1965 to 1967.  As GOCJCF, he was the third-highest-ranking officer in the South African Defence Force's Supreme Command.

Awards and decorations
In 1945 then Brigadier Bierman was made Commander of the Order of the British Empire. The notice in the London Gazette reads as follows:

The KING has been graciously pleased to give orders for the following promotions in, and appointments to, the Most Excellent Order of the British Empire, in recognition of gallant and distinguished services in Italy:To be Additional Commanders of the Military Division of the said Most Excellent Order:Brigadier (temporary) Jacobus Nicolas Bierman (105970V), South African Forces.

He was also awarded the Bronze Star

See also

List of South African military chiefs
South African Army
South African Defence Force

References

1910 births
1977 deaths
Graduates of the Royal College of Defence Studies
Chiefs of the South African Army
People from Potchefstroom
Rugby union players from Potchefstroom
South Africa international rugby union players
South African Commanders of the Order of the British Empire
South African military personnel of World War II
South African people of British descent
South African rugby union players
White South African people